Amelie Plante (born ) is a Canadian female artistic gymnast, representing her nation at international competitions.  She participated at the 2004 Summer Olympics.

References

External links
http://olympic.ca/team-canada/amelie-plante/
http://gymnast.bplaced.com/AG/Plante.htm

1983 births
Living people
Canadian female artistic gymnasts
Place of birth missing (living people)
Gymnasts at the 2004 Summer Olympics
Olympic gymnasts of Canada